Église Saint-Jean-Baptiste de La Porta is a Roman Catholic church in La Porta, Haute-Corse, Corsica. The 18th century building was classified as a Historic Monument in 1975.

References

18th-century Roman Catholic church buildings in France
Churches in Corsica
Monuments historiques of Corsica
Buildings and structures in Haute-Corse